"I Keep Coming Back" is a song recorded by American country music artist Josh Gracin.  It was released in October 2006 as the second single from the album We Weren't Crazy.  The song reached #28 on the Billboard Hot Country Songs chart.  The song was written by Jeffrey Steele and Steve Robson.

Chart performance

References

2006 singles
2006 songs
Josh Gracin songs
Songs written by Steve Robson
Songs written by Jeffrey Steele
Lyric Street Records singles